Kadimah (lit. Onward) (German: A.V. Kadima Wien) was the first Jewish student association in Vienna, founded many years before Theodor Herzl became the leading spokesman of the Zionist movement.

History
The national Jewish and Zionist Kadimah was founded by Nathan Birnbaum together with Moses Schnirer, Ruben Bierer and Peretz Smolenskin in Vienna on 25 October 1882. 

Well-known members of Kadimah include Sigmund Freud, Isidor Schalit and Fritz Löhner-Beda.

Members of the Kadimah founded the Jewish studentenverbindung Hasmonaea Czernowitz in 1891, Moriah Vienna in 1893 and Barissia Radautz in 1912.

This movement was founded by Galician students in Vienne, but dominated by Western Jews around 1900. Hitler's Vienna, by Brigitte Hamann, page 272

Kadimah itself was liquidated by then Nazi-ruled official authorities in August 1938.

References

Further reading
 Ludwig Rosenhek (editor), Festschrift zur Feier des 100. Semesters der akademischen Verbindung Kadimah 1883-1933, Wien 1933
 Harriet Zivia Pass, Kadimah: Jewish Nationalism in Vienna before Herzl, Columbia 1969 

Zionism in Austria
Zionist organizations
Forerunners of Zionism
Jews and Judaism in Vienna
Jewish Austrian history
Jewish Austro-Hungarian history